Philip D. Burden is a geographer,  map dealer and historian. He is best known as the author of The Mapping of North America: A List of Printed Maps 1511–1670 and The Mapping of North America II: A List of Printed Maps 1671–1700. These books are widely considered the authoritative works on the topic of historic North American cartography.

Works
The Mapping of North America: A List of Printed Maps 1511–1670 (1996). Raleigh Publications, Rickmansworth, Hertfordshire, UK. .
The Mapping of North America II: A List of Printed Maps 1671–1700 (2007). Raleigh Publications, Rickmansworth, Hertfordshire, UK. .

References

External links
Clive A. Burden Ltd.
Review of The Mapping of North America on mapforum.com.

American geographers
Living people
Year of birth missing (living people)